Briggs Sanitorium is a former sanitorium (also listed as Briggs' Sanitarium) developed in 1896 by Dr. J.R. Briggs, and located at the corner of Jefferson and Tyler streets, in Oak Cliff, Texas. Noted as the first hospital built in Oak Cliff, it included five wings, containing fifty-two rooms. 

In 1905, its medical director was J. R. Briggs.

The building burned down in a devastating fire, which started in the sanitarium's laboratory, and continued on to ravage fourteen city blocks on April 4, 1909.

References

Buildings and structures in Dallas County, Texas
Hospitals established in 1896
Defunct hospitals in Texas
1909 disestablishments in Texas
Hospitals disestablished in 1909
1896 establishments in Texas
Tuberculosis sanatoria in the United States